Tyrosyl-DNA phosphodiesterase 1 is an enzyme that in humans is encoded by the TDP1 gene.

The protein encoded by this gene is involved in repairing stalled topoisomerase I-DNA complexes by catalyzing the hydrolysis of the phosphodiester bond between the tyrosine residue of Type I topoisomerase and the 3-prime phosphate of DNA. This protein may also remove glycolate from single-stranded DNA containing 3-prime phosphoglycolate, suggesting a role in repair of free-radical mediated DNA double-strand breaks. 

This gene is a member of the phospholipase D family and contains two PLD phosphodiesterase domains. Mutations in this gene are associated with the disease spinocerebellar ataxia with axonal neuropathy (SCAN1). While several transcript variants may exist for this gene, the full-length natures of only two have been described to date. These two represent the major variants of this gene and encode the same isoform.

References

Further reading

External links
  GeneReviews/NCBI/NIH/UW entry on Spinocerebellar Ataxia with Axonal Neuropathy, Autosomal Recessive